The anti-Stalinist left is a term that refers to various kinds of Marxist political movements that opposed Joseph Stalin, Stalinism, Neo-Stalinism and the system of governance that Stalin implemented as leader of the Soviet Union between 1924 and 1953. This term also refers to the high ranking political figures and governmental programs that opposed Joseph Stalin and his form of communism, such as Leon Trotsky and other traditional Marxists within the Left Opposition.

In recent years, it may also refer to left and centre-left wing opposition to dictatorships, cults of personality, totalitarianism and police states, all being features commonly attributed to regimes that took inspiration from Stalinism such as the regimes of Kim Il-sung, Enver Hoxha and others, including in the former Eastern Bloc. Some of the notable movements with the anti-Stalinist left have been Trotskyism and Titoism, anarchism and libertarian socialism, left communism and libertarian Marxism, the Right Opposition within the Communist movement, and democratic socialism and social democracy.

Revolutionary era critiques (pre-1924) 

A large majority of the political left was initially enthusiastic about the Bolshevik Revolution in the revolutionary era. In the beginning, the Bolsheviks and their policies received much support because the movement was originally painted by Lenin and other leaders in a libertarian light.  However, as more politically repressive methods were used, the Bolsheviks steadily lost support from many anarchists and revolutionaries. Prominent anarchist communists and libertarian Marxists such as Sylvia Pankhurst, Rosa Luxemburg, and later, Emma Goldman were among the first left-wing critics of Bolshevism.

Rosa Luxemburg was heavily critical of the methods that Bolsheviks used to seize power in the October Revolution claiming that it was "not a movement of the people but of the bourgeoisie." Primarily, Luxemburg's critiques were based on the manner in which the Bolsheviks suppressed anarchist movements. In one of her essays published titled, "The Nationalities Question in the Russian Revolution", she explains:"To be sure, in all these cases, it was really not the "people" who engaged in these reactionary policies, but only the bourgeois and petit bourgeois classes, who - in sharpest opposition to their own proletarian masses - perverted the "national right of self-determination" into an instrument of their counter-revolutionary class policies."Because of her early criticisms toward the Bolsheviks, her legacy was vilified by Stalin once he rose to power. According to Trotsky, Stalin was "often lying about her and vilifying her" in the eyes of the public.

The relations between the anarchists and the Bolsheviks worsened in Soviet Russia due to the suppression of movements like the Kronstadt rebellion and the Makhnovist movement. The Kronstadt rebellion (March 1921) was a key moment during which many libertarian and democratic leftists broke with the Bolsheviks, laying the foundations for the anti-Stalinist left. The American anti-Stalinist socialist Daniel Bell later said:
Every radical generation, it is said, has its Kronstadt. For some it was the Moscow Trials, for others the Nazi-Soviet Pact, for still others Hungary (The Raik Trial or 1956), Czechoslovakia (the defenestration of Masaryk in 1948 or the Prague Spring of 1968), the Gulag, Cambodia, Poland (and there will be more to come). My Kronstadt was Kronstadt.
Another key anti-Stalinist, Louis Fischer, later coined the term "Kronstadt moment" for this.

Like Rosa Luxemburg, Emma Goldman was primarily critical of Lenin's style of leadership, but her focus eventually transferred over to Stalin and his policies as he rose to power. In her essay titled "There Is No Communism in Russia",  Goldman details how Stalin "abused the power of his position" and formed a dictatorship. In this text she states:"In other words, by the Central Committee and Politbureau of the Party, both of them controlled absolutely by one man, Stalin. To call such a dictatorship, this personal autocracy more powerful and absolute than any Czar’s, by the name of Communism seems to me the acme of imbecility."Emma Goldman asserted that there was "not the least sign in Soviet Russia even of authoritarian, State Communism." Emma Goldman remained critical of Stalin and the Bolshevik's style of governance up until her death in 1940.

Overall, the left communists and anarchists were critical of the statist, repressive, and totalitarian nature of Marxism–Leninism which eventually carried over to Stalinism and Stalin's policy in general.

Bolshevik era critiques of Stalin (1924–1930) 

One of the last attempts of the Right Opposition to resist Stalin was the Ryutin Affair in 1932, where a manifesto against the policy of collectivization was circulated; it openly called for "The Liquidation of the dictatorship of Stalin and his clique". Later, some rightists joined a secret bloc with Leon Trotsky, Zinoviev and Kamenev in order to oppose Stalin. Historian Pierre Broué stated that it dissolved in early 1933.

Leon Trotsky and Stalin disagreed on issues of industrialization and revolutionary tactics. Trotsky believed that there was a need for super-industrialization while Stalin believed in a rapid surge and collectivization, as written in his 5-year plan. Trotsky believed an accelerated global surge to be the answer to institute communism globally. Trotsky was critical of Stalin's methods because he believed that the slower pace of collectivization and industrialization to be ineffective in the long run. Trotsky also disagreed with Stalin's thesis of Socialism in One Country, believing that the institution of revolution in one state or country would not be as effective as a global revolution. He also criticized how the Socialism in One Country thesis broke with the internationalist traditions of Marxism. Trotskyists believed that a permanent global revolution was the most effective method to ensure the system of communism was enacted worldwide.

Overall, Trotsky and his followers were very critical of the lack of internal debate and discussion among Stalinist organizations along with their politically repressive methods.

Popular Front era critiques (1930–1939) 

From the 1930s and beyond, Leon Trotsky and his American supporter James P. Cannon described the Soviet Union as a "degenerated workers' state", the revolutionary gains of which should be defended against imperialist aggression despite the emergence of a gangster-like ruling stratum, the party bureaucracy. While defending the Russian Revolution from outside aggression, Trotsky, Cannon and their followers at the same time urged an anti-bureaucratic political revolution against Stalinism to be conducted by the Soviet working class themselves.

During the 1930s, critics of Stalin, both inside and outside the Soviet Union, were under heavy attack by the party. The Great Purge occurred from 1936-1938 as a result of growing internal tensions between the critics of Stalin but eventually turned into an all-out cleansing of "anti-Soviet elements". A majority of those targeted were peasants and minorities, but anarchists and democratic socialist opponents were also targeted for their criticisms of the severely repressive political techniques that Stalin used. Many were executed or sent to Gulag prison camps extrajudicially. It is estimated that during the Great Purge, casualties ranged from 600,000 to over 1 million people.

Concurrently, fascism was rising across Europe. The Soviet leadership turned to popular front policy during the 1930s, in which Communists worked with liberal and even conservative allies to defend against a presumed Fascist assault. One of the more notable conflicts could be seen in the Spanish Civil War. While the whole left fought alongside the Republican faction, within it there were sharp conflicts between the Communists, on the one hand, and anarchists, Trotskyists and the POUM on the other. Support for the latter became a key issue for the anti-Stalinist left internationally, as exemplified by the ILP Contingent in the International Brigades, George Orwell's book Homage to Catalonia, the periodical Spain and the World, and various pamphlets by Emma Goldman, Rudolf Rocker and others.

In other countries too, non-Communist left parties competed with Stalinism as the same time as they fought the right. The Three Arrows symbol was adopted by the German Social Democrats to signify this multi-pronged conflict.

Mid-century critiques (1939–1953) 

Dissidents in the Trotskyist Socialist Workers Party, witnessing the collaboration of Joseph Stalin and Adolf Hitler in the invasion and the partition of Poland and the Soviet invasion of the Baltic states, argued that the Soviet Union had actually emerged as a new social formation, which was neither capitalist nor socialist. Adherents of that view, espoused most explicitly by Max Shachtman and closely following the writings of James Burnham and Bruno Rizzi, argued that the Soviet bureaucratic collectivist regime had in fact entered one of two great imperialist "camps" aiming to wage war to divide the world. The first of the imperialist camps, which Stalin and the Soviet Union were said to have joined as a directly participating ally, was headed by Nazi Germany and included most notably Fascist Italy. In that original analysis, the "second imperialist camp" was headed by England and France, actively supported by the United States.

Shachtman and his cothinkers argued for the establishment of a broad "third camp" to unite the workers and colonial peoples of the world in revolutionary struggle against the imperialism of the German-Soviet-Italian and the Anglo-American-French blocs. Shachtman concluded that the Soviet policy was one of imperialism and that the best result for the international working class would be the defeat of the Soviet Union in the course of its military incursions. Conversely, Trotsky argued that a defeat for the Soviet Union would strengthen capitalism and reduce the possibilities for political revolution.

Josip Broz Tito became one of the most prominent leftist critics of Stalin after World War II. The Communist Party of Yugoslavia and the policies that were established was originally closely modeled on that of the Soviet Union. In the eyes of many, "Yugoslavia followed perfectly down the path of Soviet Marxism". At the start, Tito was even considered "Stalin's most faithful pupil". However, as the Yugoslavian Communist Party grew in size and power, it became a secondary communist powerhouse in Europe. This eventually caused Tito to try to operate independently, which created tensions with Stalin and the Soviet Union. In 1948, the two leaders split apart because of Yugoslavian independent foreign policy and ideological differences.

Tito and his followers began a political effort to develop a new brand of Socialism that would be both Marxist–Leninist in nature yet anti-Stalinist in practice. The result was the Yugoslav system of socialist workers' self-management. This led to the philosophy of organizing of every production-related activity in society into "self-managed units". This came to be known as Titoism. Tito was critical of Stalin because he believed Stalin became "un-Marxian". In the pamphlet titled "On New Roads to Socialism" one of Tito's high ranking aides states:"The indictment is long indeed: unequal relations with and exploitation of the other socialist countries, un-Marxian treatment of the role of the leader, inequality in pay greater than in bourgeois democracies, ideological promotion of Great Russian nationalism and subordination of other peoples, a policy of division of spheres of influence with the capitalist world, monopolization of the interpretation of Marxism, the abandonment of all democratic forms..."Tito disagreed on the primary characteristics that defined Stalin's policy and style of leadership. Tito wanted to form his own version of "pure" socialism without many of the "un-Marxian" traits of Stalinism.

Other foreign leftist critics also came about during this time in Europe and America. Some of these critics include George Orwell, H. N. Brailsford, Fenner Brockway, the Young People's Socialist League, and later Michael Harrington, and the Independent Labour Party in Britain. There were also several anti-Stalinist socialists in France, including writers such as Simone Weil and Albert Camus as well as the group around Marceau Pivert.

In America, the New York Intellectuals around the journals New Leader, Partisan Review, and Dissent were among other critics. In general, these figures criticized Soviet Communism as a form of "totalitarianism which in some ways mirrored fascism." A key text for this movement was The God That Failed, edited by British socialist Richard Crossman in 1949, featuring contributions by Louis Fischer, André Gide, Arthur Koestler, Ignazio Silone, Stephen Spender and Richard Wright, about their journeys to anti-Stalinism.

New Party Era critiques (1953–1991) 

Following the death of Joseph Stalin, many prominent leaders of Stalin's cabinet sought to seize power. As a result, a Soviet Triumvirate was formed between Lavrenty Beria, Georgy Malenkov, and Nikita Khrushchev. The primary goal of the new leadership was to ensure stability in the country while leadership positions within the government were sorted out. Some of the new policy implemented that was antithetical of Stalinism included policy that was free from terror, that decentralized power, and collectivized leadership. After this long power struggle within the Soviet government, Nikita Khrushchev came into power. Once in power, Khrushchev was quick to denounce Stalin and his methods of governance. In a secret speech delivered to the 20th party congress in 1956, Khrushchev was critical of the "cult of personality of Stalin" and his selfishness as a leader:"Comrades, the cult of the individual acquired such monstrous size chiefly because Stalin himself, using all conceivable methods, supported the glorification of his own person. This is supported by numerous facts."Khrushchev also revealed to the congress the truth behind Stalin's methods of repression. In addition, he explained that Stalin had rounded up "thousands of people and sent them into a huge system of political work camps" called gulags. The truths revealed in this speech came to the surprise of many, but this fell into the plan of Khrushchev. This speech tainted Stalin's name which resulted in a significant loss of faith in his policy from government officials and citizens.

During this Cold War era, the American non-communist left (NCL) grew. The NCL was critical of the continuation of Stalinist Communism because of aspects such as famine and repression, and as later discovered, the covert intervention of Soviet state interests in the Communist Party USA (CPUSA). Members of the NCL were often ex-communists, such as the historian Theodore Draper whose views shifted from socialism to liberalism, and socialists who became disillusioned with the communist movement. Anti-Stalinist Trotskyists also wrote about their experiences during this time, such as Irving Howe and Lewis Coser. These perspectives inspired the creation of the Congress for Cultural Freedom (CCF), as well as international journals like Der Monat and Encounter; it also influenced existing publications such as the Partisan Review.  According to John Earl Haynes and Harvey Klehr, the CCF was covertly funded by the Central Intelligence Agency (CIA) to support intellectuals with pro-democratic and anti-communist stances. The Communist Party USA lost much of its influence in the first years of the Cold War due to the revelation of Stalinist crimes by Khrushchev. Although the Soviet Communist Party was no longer officially Stalinist, the Communist Party USA received a substantial subsidy from the USSR from 1959 until 1989, and consistently supported official Soviet policies such as intervention in Hungary and Czechoslovakia. The Soviet funding ended in 1989 when Gus Hall condemned the market initiatives of Mikhail Gorbachev. 

From the late 1950s, several European socialist and communist parties, such as in Denmark and Sweden, shifted away from orthodox communism which they connected to Stalinism that was in recent history. The emergence of the New Left was influenced to some degree by the Soviet invasion of Hungary in 1956 and increasing amount of information available about Stalinist terror. Albert Camus criticized Soviet communism, while many leftists saw the Soviet Union as emblematic of "state capitalism." After Stalin's death and the Khrushchev Thaw, study and opposition to Stalinism became a part of historiography. The historian Moshe Lewin cautioned not to categorize the entire history of the Soviet Union as Stalinist, but also emphasized that Stalin's bureaucracy had permanently established "bureaucratic absolutism," resembling old monarchy, in the Soviet Union.

Post-Soviet critiques (1991–present) 
After the fall of Gorbachev and the Soviet Union in 1991, the anti-Stalinist movement grew rapidly. 

In the early 1990s, many new anti-Stalinist left movements emerged in the former Soviet bloc as a result of failed elections and Boris Yeltsin’s Palace Coup. When this seizure of power occurred, more than thirty electoral blocs set out to contest the election. Some of these anti-Stalinist groups were: Choice of Russia, the Civic Union for Stability, Justice & Progress, Constructive Ecological Movement, Russian Democratic Reform Movement, Dignity and Mercy, and Women of Russia. Even though these movements were not successful in contesting the election, they displayed how there was still a strong support of anti-Stalinism after the collapse of the Soviet Union. These movements were all critical of Stalinist policy and some even called it an "unmitigated disaster for socialists"

Notable figures 

 Leon Trotsky
 Clement Attlee
 Colette Audry
 Daniel Bell
 André Breton
Albert Camus
 Milovan Djilas
 Daniel Guérin
 Sidney Hook
 Irving Howe
 CLR James
 Lucien Laurat
 Claude Lefort
 Marcel Martinet
 Dwight MacDonald
 Mary McCarthy
 Claude McKay
 Maurice Nadeau
 Pierre Naville
 The New York Intellectuals
 Benjamin Péret
 Henry Poulaille
 David Rousset
 Jean-Paul Sartre
 Victor Serge
 Ota Šik

 George Orwell
IF Stone
Carlo Tresca

See also 
 Anti-Leninism
 Anti-communism
 De-Stalinization
 Eurocommunism
 Harvill Secker
 Jewish Anti-Fascist Committee
 Left Opposition
 Left-wing uprisings against the Bolsheviks
 Libertarian socialism
 New Left
 Red fascism
 Tankie – pejorative term used by anti-authoritarian socialists
 The Stalinist Legacy

References

Further reading 
 Ian Birchall Sartre Against Stalinism. Berghahn Books. (See review here.)
 
 Julius Jacobson The Russian Question And American Socialism,New Politics, vol. 6, no. 3 (new series), whole no. 23, Summer 1997
 Alan Johnson The Cultural Cold War: Faust Not the Pied Piper, New Politics, vol. 8, no. 3 (new series), whole no. 31, Summer 2001
 David Renton, Dissident Marxism 2004 Zed Books 
 Boris Souvarine, Stalin, 1935
 Frances Stonor Saunders, Who Paid the Piper?: CIA and the Cultural Cold War, 1999, Granta,  (USA: The Cultural Cold War: The CIA and the World of Arts and Letters, 2000, The New Press).
 Alan Wald The New York Intellectuals, The Rise and Decline of the Anti-Stalinist Left From the 1930s to the 1980s. Chapel Hill: University of North Carolina Press, 1987. 440 pp (See review by Paul LeBlanc here)

External links 
 

 
Communism
Eponymous political ideologies
History of socialism
Marxism
Political ideologies
Political movements
Socialism
Joseph Stalin